Dean Cornell Jessee (born 1929) is a historian of the early Latter Day Saint movement and leading expert on the writings of Joseph Smith Jr.

Biography
Jessee was one of the sons of Phillip Cornell Jessee and Minerva Boss. He was raised in Springville, Utah as a member of the Church of Jesus Christ of Latter-day Saints (LDS Church).  He served an LDS mission to Germany.

In 1959, Jessee received his Master of Arts in LDS church history from the College of Religion at Brigham Young University (BYU), writing his thesis on the controversial topic of Mormon fundamentalism (D. Michael Quinn claims BYU restricted access to this paper for several years). He then taught LDS Seminary for four years at West High School in Salt Lake City.

In his career, Jesse was a respected archivist, editor and historian, as well as an authority on early Mormon handwriting. Davis Bitton called him one of the "[Mormon] historians who are deeply familiar with the sources on Mormon origins [yet] still find it possible to remain in the fold."  In addition to his mission, Jessee has served in his local Salt Lake City congregation as a home teacher and counselor of the high priest group, as well as a stake family history coordinator.

Jessee married Margaret June Wood and they had eight children and reside in Salt Lake City. Jessee's younger brother Donald served in the LDS Church as president of the Oregon Portland Mission and as a Regional Representative.

Church Historian's Office
In 1964, Jessee was hired by the Church Historian's Office under Joseph Fielding Smith as an archivist in the church historical archives.

While Leonard J. Arrington was researching a book on the Mormon development of western America, he met Jessee in the church archives during 1967.  As a cataloguer of manuscripts, Jessee informed Arrington of many useful documents in the archive that historians had not yet studied.  Arrington later recalled that at the time Jessee was "Intelligent, well-informed, hardworking, and modest," and that "he knew more about the documents of LDS history than any other person."

In the late 1960s, Jessee was invited by Truman G. Madsen, at BYU's Institute of Mormon Studies, to publish articles on Joseph Smith and early Mormon history in BYU Studies.  This began Jessee's research and publication in early Mormon manuscripts and historical documents.

In 1972, Leonard J. Arrington became the official Church Historian.  He requested the transfer of Jessee from the archives to the new History Division, a newly created, impressive team of historians for researching and writing of new Mormon histories.  One such work, Jessee's 1974 Letters of Brigham Young to his Sons, caused Apostle Boyd K. Packer to bring concerns to the First Presidency about the Historical Department's "orientation toward scholarly work," an early sign of the tension that would eventually lead to the History Division's disbandment.  Jessee was also assigned by Arrington to locate, collect and transcribe all of Joseph Smith Jr.'s writings, a work inspired by the Thomas Jefferson Papers of the 1950s and those of other Founding Fathers.

In the 1980s, Jessee was a major player in the Historical Department's examinations of important historical documents produced by Mark Hofmann, which were later found to be forgeries.  Jessee was considered the preeminent expert on early Mormon handwriting, especially Joseph Smith's, and he authenticated and defended a number of Hofmann's forgeries, including the famous "Salamander Letter". Hofmann's extensive deception of document and forgery experts led him to be called "unquestionably the most skilled forger this country has ever seen".

Jessee served as a research historian in the church's Historical Department until 1981, when he was transferred to the Joseph Fielding Smith Institute for Latter-day Saint History at Brigham Young University (BYU).  At BYU, he was also an associate professor of history and LDS Church history.

Joseph Smith Papers
As a Senior Historical Associate then Senior Research Fellow, Jessee served for nineteen years in the Joseph Fielding Smith Institute. During this time he continued his earlier work to produce the papers of Joseph Smith.  In 1984, he published most of Smith's own writings and many of his dictations in The Personal Writings of Joseph Smith. This research continued to expand into two volumes of The Papers of Joseph Smith, one in 1989 on Smith's autobiographical and historical writings, and the other in 1992 on Smith's journals.

Jessee's efforts were eventually made an official joint effort of BYU and the LDS Church in 2001, called the Joseph Smith Papers Project. This is intended to be a large multi-volume series, including virtually everything written by Joseph Smith, by his office, or under his direction. That year, Larry H. Miller, a Salt Lake City businessman and philanthropist, began funding the venture.  In 2005, Miller announced the goal of completing the project by 2015, "while Dean Jessee is still around", since Jessee was then in his 70s. Jessee is general manager of the project along with Richard Bushman and Ron Esplin.

Honors

 Best Article Award for "The Writing of Joseph Smith’s History" (Mormon History Association: 1971)
 Best Book Award for Letters of Brigham Young to his Sons (Mormon History Association: 1975) 
 Vice-president of the Mormon History Association (1978–79)
 President of the Mormon History Association (1980–81)
 First winner of the Grace Arrington Award for Historical Excellence (Mormon History Association: 1982)
 The T. Edgar Lyon Award for Best Article for "Return to Carthage: Writing the History of Joseph Smith’s Martyrdom" (Mormon History Association: 1983) 
 Best Book Award in documentary history for The Personal Writings of Joseph Smith (Mormon History Association: 1984)
 Steven F. Christensen Best Documentary Award for The Papers of Joseph Smith: Autobiographical and Historical Writings, vol. 1 (Mormon History Association: 1989)
 Steven F. Christensen Best Documentary Award for Steven F. Christensen Best Documentary Award (Mormon History Association: 1992)
 Steven F. Christensen Best Documentary Award for The Joseph Smith Papers: Journals, vol. 1, 1832-1839 (Mormon History Association: 2009)
 Special Award in Textual Criticism and Bibliography for The Joseph Smith Papers: Journals, vol. 1, 1832-1839 (Association for Mormon Letters: 2009)

Writings
In the 1980s, Jessee worked on editing some of Wilford Woodruff's journals though he never published them.

Books

Academic journals

Other articles

Papers

Reviews
The following are published reviews of Jessee's writings:

Letters of Brigham Young to His Sons
 William Mulder (Winter 1974), Dialogue: A Journal of Mormon Thought: pp. 77–80
 S. George Ellsworth (Winter 1975), Utah Historical Quarterly: pp. 190–91
 Jan Shipps (March 1975), Journal of American History: pp. 1007–08
 Stanford J. Layton (Spring 1975), BYU Studies: pp.378–80

The Personal Writings of Joseph Smith
 Richard Lloyd Anderson (1984), Journal of Mormon History: pp.113–18
 Golden A. Buchmiller (September 2, 1984), Church News: p. 14
 (Winter 1985), Utah Historical Quarterly: p. 107–08
 Marvin S. Hill (Summer 1985), BYU Studies: pp. 117–25
 Roger D. Launius (Summer 1989), Dialogue: A Journal of Mormon Thought: pp.142–43
 Ronald E. Romig (Spring 2004), Journal of Mormon History: pp. 221–24

The Papers of Joseph Smith
 Roger D. Launius (Fall 1990), Dialogue: A Journal of Mormon Thought: pp. 203–04
 Roger D. Launius (Winter 1990), Illinois Historical Journal: p. 284
 James C. Bedford (Fall 1991), Journal of the Early Republic: pp. 451–52
 Richard Dilworth Rust (1993), BYU Studies: pp. 339–44
 Richard L. Bushman (Spring 1993), Journal of Mormon History: pp.183–87
 David J. Whittaker (June 1993), Church History: pp. 283–84

Notes

References
 .

External links 
 

1929 births
20th-century Mormon missionaries
American Latter Day Saint writers
American Mormon missionaries in Germany
Brigham Young University alumni
Brigham Young University faculty
Brigham Young University staff
Church Educational System instructors
Historians of the Latter Day Saint movement
Latter Day Saints from Utah
Living people
People from Springville, Utah
Writers from Salt Lake City